Bruno de Oliveira Furlan (born 9 July 1992) is a Brazilian footballer.

Career
He played for Dinamo Minsk on loan from Atlético Paranaense.

Career statistics
(Correct )

References

External links
 ogol.com

1992 births
Living people
Brazilian footballers
Association football forwards
Campeonato Brasileiro Série A players
Campeonato Brasileiro Série B players
Brazilian expatriate footballers
Expatriate footballers in Belarus
Club Athletico Paranaense players
FC Dinamo Minsk players
Clube Náutico Capibaribe players
Joinville Esporte Clube players
ABC Futebol Clube players
América Futebol Clube (RN) players
FC Vitebsk players
People from Campo Grande
Sportspeople from Mato Grosso do Sul